Syed Wajid Ali (20 December 1911 – 14 June 2008) was a leading industrialist of Pakistan who is also known for his services to the Olympic Movement. He became the President of Pakistan Olympic Association in 1978 and stayed on the post for 26 years until he retired in 2004 to become the longest serving president in the history of the association. He is also known for promoting arts and culture as well as Red Crescent (Red Cross) in Pakistan.

Career 
Wajid Ali, was born on 20 December 1911 in Lahore, Punjab, British India. He was the second son of Sir Syed Maratib Ali, the younger brother of Amjad Ali.

In the early 1940s, he quit the army to look after the growing family business. In 1945, he established a textile plant in Rahim Yar Khan, which was only wound up in 1997. He also became actively involved in the Pakistan Movement and closely worked for the cause alongside Muhammad Ali Jinnah and Fatima Jinnah. During the movement, he was nominated by the Muslim League on a three-member Committee to oversee the British government arranged referendum in the North West Frontier Province.

An Industrialist 
In Pakistan, he set up and managed a number of industrial ventures. Among the major projects was a Ford car manufacturing plant, which was subsequently taken over by the Government in 1973 as part of the nationalisation process of Zulfiqar Ali Bhutto. In his other industrial activities, he remained the chairman of some of the largest enterprises in Pakistan, including Packages Limited, Treet Corporation, Zulfeqar Industries, Loads Limited, and Wazir Ali Industries.

Introduction of television in Pakistan
Ali was the first person, who in 1961, signed a joint venture agreement with Nippon Electric Company of Japan to initiate a television project in Pakistan. Later, this proved to be a visionary first step in introducing television in Pakistan before it was introduced in India, Indonesia, Malaysia and some other Asian countries. Ubaidur Rahman, an electrical engineer who later became General Manager of Pakistan Television Corporation, Lahore Center, was appointed by him to lead this television project with the Japanese. The project team conducted a series of pilot transmission tests. Then the control of this project was given to President Ayub Khan's government in 1962. A small studio within a tent in the Radio Pakistan compound in Lahore was set up to begin the television project work. Here a transmission tower was also constructed. Finally the first TV black and white transmission from Lahore took place on 26 Nov 1964 and television was introduced in Pakistan.

Death 
Ali died after a protracted illness on 14 June 2008. He was buried at Miani Sahib Graveyard in Lahore, Pakistan.

See also
Pakistan Olympic Association

References

1911 births
2008 deaths
Pakistani sports executives and administrators
Pakistani industrialists
Businesspeople from Lahore
Government College University, Lahore alumni
Pakistani social workers
Pakistani philanthropists
Pakistan Television Corporation executives
Pakistan Movement activists from Punjab
Burials at Miani Sahib Graveyard
Syed Wajid
20th-century philanthropists